Bircotes is an area in the civil parish of Harworth Bircotes (with Harworth) in the Bassetlaw district of Nottinghamshire, England on the border with South Yorkshire. The population of the civil parish was 7,948. The local school in the area is Serlby Park Academy. Bircotes was founded in the 1920s, with the discovery of coal during the First World War and the establishment of Harworth Colliery (which has since closed), to provide homes for miners. It was home to one of the last deep-mine pits in the UK.

See also
 RAF Bircotes

References

External links

Villages in Nottinghamshire
Bassetlaw District